The Macbeth-Evans Glass Company was an American glass company that created "almost every kind of glass for illuminating, industrial and scientific purposes," but is today famous for making depression glass.

The company was established in 1899 after a merger between the glass companies of Thomas Evans and George A. Macbeth. The company was based out of Pittsburgh, Pennsylvania, and operated multiple offices in the region, but the most significant glass works was located in Charleroi, Pennsylvania. It quickly absorbed the American Chimney Lamp Company to gain control of M. J. Owens's patents on the Owens glass-blowing machine, as well as Hogans-Evans Company, becoming at the time the largest lamp glass manufacturer in the world. During World War I, most of the company's production was dedicated to producing glass, particularly reflectors for searchlights, for the army and navy. The company was bought by Corning Glass Works in 1936, but it continued to operate as the "Macbeth-Evans Division of Corning Glass Works in Charleroi, Pennsylvania."

Tableware 
Macbeth-Evans first introduced tableware items during the late 1920s and expanded into complete dinnerware lines in 1930. The most popular color used in tableware was pink, and the glass made was thinner than other companies of the time, thus more fragile. No candy jars, candle holders, cookie jars, or butter dishes were made by Macbeth-Evans. Pattern names were referred to by letter. Ruby red and Ritz blue colors were used in the 1930s glassware, beginning with the American Sweetheart pattern.

Some of the patterns Macbeth-Evans created were:

Petalware (1930-1940s) was among the first tableware pattern released by Macbeth-Evans and was initially produced in crystal and pink. This pattern had one of the longest production runs among Depression glass. After Corning acquired Macbeth-Evans, they continued the petalware line with added colors and decorations.
American Sweetheart (1930-1936) was produced in pale pink and translucent white (Monax), with dessert sets produced in ruby red, Ritz blue, and crystal. The pattern was an elaborate design of lacy swirls, finely detailed and quite feminine, created from a mold-etched pattern. The translucent white, when held up to the light, had a faint bluish hue to it. This unique colored glass is called "Monax" and is sometimes mistaken as milk glass, which is thicker and whiter.  American Sweetheart's Monax dishware is thinner, more opaque, and appears to be more delicate. Plates, saucers, bowls, sugar and creamer sets, salt and pepper sets, tumblers, pitchers were created with this pattern. The dessert sets included plates, cups, saucers, sugar and creamer sets, console bowls, and tid-bit sets. American Sweetheart was referred to as the R-pattern.
Chinex Classic (1930s-40s) is one of the most elegant Depression glass patterns and fits in with most fine china sets with an elaborately scrolled lacy pattern. Some patterns also have impressions of florals and castles.
Dogwood (1930–1932), sometimes called Apple Blossom or Wild Rose, is a deep mold pressed delicate pattern that has attracted many collectors of Depression glass.  A set of green can be obtained in this pattern, but the pink color is more commonly found and much easier to acquire. Other colors, listed above, are very hard to find and there are not enough pieces to put together an entire set.
Crystal Leaf (1928) is in pink, green, and crystal colors and is a pattern with stylized leaves bordering the bottom and flowing up over the pieces made. Pieces include a tankard style jug, a fancy kitchen pitcher, a 5 oz. tumbler, a 9 oz. tumbler, and 12 oz. tumbler. This pattern was made for both bedroom and kitchen use.

External links
 A brief history about Macbeth-Evans via "The Lampworks" website; an antique lamp company based out of New York

References

Design companies established in 1899
Defunct manufacturing companies based in Pennsylvania
Defunct glassmaking companies
1899 establishments in Pennsylvania
Manufacturing companies established in 1899
Design companies disestablished in 1936
Manufacturing companies disestablished in 1936
1936 disestablishments in Pennsylvania
1936 mergers and acquisitions